= Blind entry =

Blind entry may refer to a practice in one of three disparate fields:

- Bookkeeping
- Gymnastics
- Encyclopedia editing - This Wikipedia entry, along with any Wikipedia disambiguation page, is itself an example of the blind entry in encyclopedias.
